Tread Lightly! is a nonprofit organization based in Centerville, Utah, whose mission is to promote responsible recreation through stewardship, education and communication.  It was started as a campaign to address impacts from off road vehicles by the United States Forest Service in 1985, but became a nonprofit in 1990.

Background
Tread Lightly and its partners lead a national initiative to protect and enhance recreation access and opportunities by promoting outdoor ethics to heighten individuals’ sense of good stewardship. The organization's goal is to balance the needs of people who enjoy outdoor recreation with the need to maintain a healthy environment through minimum impact education and on-the-ground public land stewardship.

Tread Lightly's core ethic revolves around five tenets of responsible recreation, called the T.R.E.A.D. Principles:

Travel Responsibly
Respect the Rights of Others
Educate Yourself
Avoid Sensitive Areas
Do Your Part

See also 

 Ecology movement
 Environmental protection
 Habitat conservation
 Leave No Trace
 Trail ethics

References

External links
Tread Lightly! official web site

Non-profit organizations based in the United States
1985 establishments in the United States
Trails
Organizations established in 1985
Off-roading